Ramot Naftali is a moshav in northern Israel. Located in the Upper Galilee near the Lebanese border, it falls under the jurisdiction of Mevo'ot HaHermon Regional Council.

The community is named "Ramot Naftali" (hills of Naftali) because it is located in the Naftali Mountains, which was originally in the land owned by the Tribe of Naphtali.

History
The community was founded in 1945 by a group of agricultural workers called "Bnei Peled", graduates of Mikveh Israel, who were sent by national agencies to guard the land and prepare it for agriculture. After the end of World War II arrived the first group of discharged soldiers from two groups, "Wingate" and "HaMitnadev", who organized for settlement before they had joined the army. The fortresses were built by the construction company Solel Boneh. The fortress today is part of a nearby military base.

During the 1948 Arab–Israeli War the community was under fire for a long time, and it served as the focus of decisive battles from Lebanon. Only after Operation Hiram did the attacks in the region cease.

After the war, Ramot Naftali took over part of the land belonging to the newly depopulated Palestinian villages of Qadas and Al-Nabi Yusha'.

In August 1963 a new nucleus of founders went to Kedesh Naftali, after the dispersal of the original members of the moshav. In the community two families remained from the first founding nucleus: Eliezer and Batya Kaufman and their three children, and the Adler family. Along with seven founders were: Ra'anan Naim, Rafael Albo, Yitzhak Sabag, Freddy Preinteh, Hananya Dadush, Zevulun Kohen and Ilan Zarka.  The nucleus was composed mostly of young couples from moshavim, who had left Morocco, Tunisia and Libya. The initiative was successful, and many people joined together with the founding nucleus: Yuval Hermoni, Zevulun Kohen, the brothers Moshe and Hayyim Alon, Meir Halb, and some single men such as David Avitan, and many others. The settlers lived first in abandoned houses of the first nucleus atop the mountain, but within three years new houses were built at the foot of the mountain, which eventually were expanded.

Economy
The moshav is known for growing apples, peaches and grapes.  The grapes of Ramot Naftali are considered excellent by experts, and they are sold to the finest wineries in the land.  The moshav has some boutique wineries, including Amram Winery of the vintner Amram Azulai.  Some members of the moshav make their living by tourism or growing fowl.

People
The people of Ramot Naftali are known for their contributions to the Paratroopers Brigade and to elite army units. Eitan Blahsan, a commander of Sayeret Tzanhanim, was born in Ramot Naftali, and was killed in a battle in Lebanon.  Army members had high hopes for him and thought he might someday rise to Chief of Staff (Ramatkal).  Mitzpe Eitan was erected as a memorial near the moshav, overlooking the Lebanon mountains and his parents' house.

Nearby places
Near Ramot Naftali are the following communities: kibbutz Malkia, Kibbutz Yiftah, and moshav Dishon.

The community is located next to Metzudat Koach, a compound of the British Mandate, where 28 fighters were killed when it was captured during the War of Independence.

References

External links

Ramot Naftali Yigal Alon website

Moshavim
Populated places in Northern District (Israel)
Populated places established in 1945
1945 establishments in Mandatory Palestine